Pitaviaster is a genus of flowering plants belonging to the family Rutaceae.

Its native range is Northeastern Australia.

Species:
 Pitaviaster haplophyllus (F.Muell.) T.G.Hartley

References

Zanthoxyloideae
Zanthoxyloideae genera